Ester Andujar (in Spanish, Andújar), born 1976 in Valencia, is a Spanish jazz singer notable among the younger generation of Spanish jazz musicians.

She began singing professionally in 1996 and went on to receive the Valencian Jazz Awards 'Promusics' Best vocalist in 2001 and 2002. She has toured in Latin America and Branford Marsalis invited her to sing during his tour of Spain. Her most recent CD is Celebrating Cole Porter (2006).

Web sources

External links 
 Ester Andujar website

1976 births
Living people
Spanish jazz singers
People from Valencia
21st-century Spanish singers